NADP-dependent malic enzyme is a protein that in humans is encoded by the ME1 gene.

This gene encodes a cytosolic, NADP-dependent enzyme that generates NADPH for fatty acid biosynthesis. The activity of this enzyme, the reversible oxidative decarboxylation of malate to pyruvate, links the glycolytic and citric acid cycles. The regulation of expression for this gene is complex. Increased expression can result from elevated levels of thyroid hormones or by higher proportions of carbohydrates in the diet.

References

Further reading